The Futsal European Clubs Championship was an annual futsal competition for European club teams. It was introduced in 1984 and discontinued after the 2000–01 season, when it was replaced by the UEFA Futsal Cup.

Results

Performance by nation

References

International club futsal competitions
Defunct international club association football competitions in Europe
Futsal competitions in Europe